BQQ or bqq may refer to:

 BQQ, the IATA code for Barra Airport (Brazil), Brazil
 bqq, the ISO 639-3 code for Biritai language, Indonesia